Frankstown is an unincorporated community and census-designated place (CDP) in Blair County, Pennsylvania, United States. It was first listed as a CDP prior to the 2020 census.

The CDP is in central Blair County, on the west side of Frankstown Township. It is bordered to the southeast by U.S. Route 22, which leads southwest  to Hollidaysburg and east  to Huntingdon. The community and surrounding township give their name to the Frankstown Branch Juniata River, which passes the CDP just south of US-22.

Demographics

References 

Census-designated places in Blair County, Pennsylvania
Census-designated places in Pennsylvania